Crashing Hollywood can refer to:

 Crashing Hollywood (1931 film), a 1931 film directed by Fatty Arbuckle
 Crashing Hollywood (1938 film), a 1938 film directed by Lew Landers